The Lausanne Marathon  is an annual marathon race held in the Swiss city of Lausanne since 1993.  The road race generally takes place in October, while the 20 km of Lausanne takes place in April.  A half marathon and multiple  races (run, walk, and Nordic walk) are also held.

The Lausanne Marathon is one of the largest annual sporting events of the Canton de Vaud, and attracts up to 2,500 tourists each year.

History 

The first edition was held in 1993, with the inauguration of the Olympic Museum.

In 2005, Ethiopia's Tesfaye Eticha won the men's competition for a record seventh time.

In 2009, a record 10,658 runners participated.

The 2020 edition of the race was cancelled, three days before its scheduled date, due to a spike of coronavirus cases during the second wave of the coronavirus pandemic, with all registrants given the option of obtaining a refund.

Course 

The race starts in Lausanne, Place de Milan (next to the Parc de Milan), and then follows the road along the Lake Léman until La Tour-de-Peilz, before returning to Lausanne via the same route. The finish is located in front of the Olympic Museum fountain.

The half-marathon (21 km) starts from La Tour-de-Peilz (since 2000) and ends in Lausanne.

Winners 

Key: Course record (in bold)

Notes

References

List of winners
Civai, Franco et al. (2011-10-31). Lausanne Marathon. Association of Road Racing Statisticians. Retrieved on 2011-11-01.

External links

Official website

  

Marathons in Switzerland
Recurring sporting events established in 1993
Marathon
Autumn events in Switzerland